Shady Lake Park was a small amusement park operated by the Humphrey Family in Streetsboro, Ohio.  The park opened in 1978 and closed in 1982.  Most of the rides at Shady Lake Park were relocated from Euclid Beach Park.  Many of the rides from Shady Lake Park ended up at Old Indiana Fun Park, including the Euclid Beach Chief.  The tall gate structure, resembling the one at Euclid Beach Park, remained standing until 2004.  Today, the land along Route 14 is home to Shady Lake Apartments and a Raising Cane’s.

References

Amusement parks in Ohio
Defunct amusement parks in Ohio
Buildings and structures in Portage County, Ohio
1978 establishments in Ohio
1982 disestablishments in Ohio
Amusement parks opened in 1978
Amusement parks closed in 1982